was a Japanese nurse who worked with patients who had leprosy. She was diagnosed as having leprosy, and hospitalized at Koyama Fukusei Hospital in 1919. It proved a misdiagnosis three years later, but she was deeply impressed by Drouart de Lézey, the director of the hospital, and was determined to work as a nurse with leprosy patients. In 1961, she was awarded the Florence Nightingale Medal.

The pronunciation of Koyama Fukusei Hospital
"Kohyama Fukusei Hospital" or  "Kōyama Fukusei Hospital". Koyama Fukusei Hospital is described in the reference and Koyama Fukusei Hospital

Life
Yae Ibuka was born on 23 October 1897 in Taipei, Formosa (now Taiwan) as a daughter of a congressman, Hikosaburo Ibuka. Her mother left the Ibuka family when her parents divorced when she was 7 years old. She graduated from Doshisha Girls' School (now Doshisha Women's College of Liberal Arts) in 1918.

While she was teaching English in Nagasaki, she developed a skin change, which was diagnosed as a sign of leprosy. She was hospitalized at Koyama Fukusei Hospital without knowing the diagnosis. The diagnosis was shocking to her. Since her disease did not progress, she sought the diagnosis of Prof. Keizo Dohi of Tokyo University in 1922. Leprosy was denied. Observing the director of the hospital, she was determined to work for leprosy patients and became a nurse. In 1923, she became the only qualified nurse at the hospital. She had remained the chief nurse at the hospital until 6 April 1978, when she became the honorary chief nurse. Her dedication to leprosy patients was highly appreciated. She became the first president of Japan Catholic Nurses' Association. She died on 15 May 1989, one day before the 100th anniversary of the Koyama Fukusei Hospital. On May 16, she was given a special award by Princess Takamatsu of Japan.

Honors
In 1959, she was given the Order of St. Sylvester by Pope John XXIII.
In 1961, she was given the Florence Nightingale Medal.
In 1977, she was given the Asahi Social Welfare Award.

Relatives
Masaru Ibuka of Sony was her remote relative.

References
Koyama Fukusei Hospital
120 years of Kouyama Fukusei Hospital(2009), Kouyama Fukusei Hospital

Footnotes

Leprosy in Japan
1897 births
1989 deaths
Japanese Roman Catholics
Japanese nurses
Leprosy nurses and caregivers
Florence Nightingale Medal recipients
Scientists from Taipei
Doshisha Women's College of Liberal Arts alumni